The Pentax XG-1 is a DSLR-like ultrazoom bridge camera announced by Pentax on July 15, 2014. At the time of its release, it had the third longest reach of any compact camera, with a maximum of 1248mm equivalent focal length, after the Nikon Coolpix P600 at 1440mm, and the Sony Cyber-shot DSC-H400 at 1550mm, both announced in February of the same year. A fourth camera, the Kodak Pixpro Astro Zoom AZ651, announced in January with a maximum focal length of 1560mm, has yet to make it to market, as of February 2015.

References
http://www.dpreview.com/products/pentax/compacts/pentax_xg1/specifications

XG-1
Superzoom cameras
Cameras introduced in 2014